Dan Goggin is an American writer, composer, and lyricist for musical theatre.

Biography
Goggin began his career as a singer in the Broadway production of Luther, which starred Albert Finney. He then toured for five years as a member of the folksinging duo, The Saxons, before writing the music for and appearing in the off-Broadway musical Hark!.

Goggin began composing both music and lyrics for revues satirizing current events, trends, and personalities. He later composed incidental music for the short-lived 1976 Broadway production, Legend, starring Elizabeth Ashley and F. Murray Abraham, which closed after five performances.

Goggin's early life experiences, including schooling by the Marywood Dominican Sisters and his days as a seminarian, influenced him to create his greatest success. A line of greeting cards featuring a nun offering tart quips caught on so quickly that Goggin decided to expand the concept into a cabaret show called The Nunsense Story, which opened for a four-day run at Manhattan's Duplex and remained for 38 weeks, encouraging its creator to expand it into a full-length theater production.

What followed was Nunsense (1985), one of off-Broadway's biggest commercial successes, which ran a total of 3672 performances. By the time it closed, it had become an international phenomenon translated into 21 languages with more than 5000 productions worldwide. Goggin followed it with six sequels, Nunsense 2: The Second Coming, Sister Amnesia's Country Western Nunsense Jamboree, Nuncrackers: The Nunsense Christmas Musical, Meshuggah-Nuns!, Nunsensations: The Nunsense Vegas Revue, and Nunset Boulevard. In 1998 Dan opened an all-male production of Nunsense entitled Nunsense A-Men! The show played in New York City to rave reviews.

Goggin also wrote the book, music, and lyrics for A One-Way Ticket To Broadway and Balancing Act, neither of which was as successful as the Nunsense franchise.

References

External links
 
 
 Dan Goggin at Internet Off-Broadway Database

1943 births
Living people
American male composers
21st-century American composers
20th-century American dramatists and playwrights
American male singers
American male stage actors
People from Alma, Michigan
Roman Catholic writers
21st-century American male musicians